The Three Little Pigs (Dutch:De 3 Biggetjes) is a Flemish musical, with music and lyrics by Johan Vanden Eede and Miquel Wiels, based on the fairy-tale and serves as a sequel to it. It tells the story of the three daughters of the pig with the brick house: Knirri (Pirky), Knarri (Parky), and Knorri (Porki), who work as waitresses in their mother's Three Little Pigs Café. Meanwhile, the big bad wolf now has three sons, who are the same age as the three pig sisters. The wolf wants his sons to catch the three pig sisters as part of a personal vendetta, but the pigs and wolves fall in love with each other instead.

Casts
The principal original casts of the major productions of De Drie Biggetjes.

Recording chart positions

References

2003 musicals
Musicals based on short fiction
Works based on The Three Little Pigs
Plays based on fairy tales